Hans Vandekerckhove (1957, Kortrijk) is a Belgian painter, living and working in Ghent. From 1975 to 1997 Vandekerckhove studied Art History at University Ghent, where he wrote his graduation thesis on David Hockney.

Exhibitions

Solo exhibitions 
2020
 Voltaire's Advice, Tatjana Pieters, Ghent (BE)
2018
 Another Portrait of an Artist, Art4Museum, Moscow (RUS)
2017
 The Christina Paintings, NK Gallery, Antwerp (BE)
2015
 Gimme Shelter, NK Gallery, Antwerp (BE)
2013
 Something in the Water does not compute, NK Gallery, Antwerp (BE)
2011
 Tears in Rain, Galerie Van De Weghe, Antwerp (BE)
2009
 Watching the Architects, Galerie Van de Weghe, Antwerp (BE)
 Picture Palace, Zebrastraat,  Stichting Liedts-Meesen, Ghent (BE)
 Paintings 1986–2007, Deweer Art, Otegem (BE)
2008
 Recent Paintings, Galerie Hof&Huyser, Amsterdam (NL)
2007
 La mirada ciega. Un diálogo entre Hans Vandekerckhove y Juan Muñoz, Fundaciòn Carlos de Ambères, Madrid (ES)
 Recent Paintings, Deweer Art, Otegem (BE)
 My Head is my only Home, bookpresentation with selection of paintings, SMAK, Ghent (BE)
2005
 Recent paintings, Galerie Le Besset, St. Jeure d’Andaure (FR)
2004
 Stalking Hiëronymus, with Anselm Kiefer and Penck, Mu.Zee, Ostend (BE)
 Recent paintings, Deweer Art Gallery, Otegem (BE)
2003
 Recent paintings, Hof&Huyser, Amsterdam (NL)
 Stalking Hiëronymus, Mercator Insurance Gallery, Antwerp (BE)
2001
 Een verzamelaar van verdwenen blikken / A Collector of vanished Looks, Elzenveld, Antwerp (BE)
 Vast geluk en vloeibare vreugde / Firm Luck and liquid Joy, Hof&Huyser, Amsterdam (NL)
 Schilderijen ter vervolmaking van methoden van onbeweeglijkheid, Deweer Art, Otegem (BE)
1998
 Hunker Bunker Tuin, Deweer Art, Otegem (BE)
1996
 Recent Paintings, Deweer Art, Otegem (BE)
1995
 Mirror, Mirror Me, De Warande, Turnhout (BE)
1993
 Watt / Schloss, Stichting Veranneman, Kruishoutem (BE)
 Hortus Conclusus / Türhüter, Deweer Art, Otegem (BE)
1991
 Hetaera Esmeralda, Deweer Art, Otegem (BE)
1990
 VMHK, Vereniging Museum Hedendaagse Kunst, Ghent (BE)
 Kunst Europa, Museum Xanten, Xanten (DE)
1989
 illumination, Vera Van Laer Gallery, Knokke / Antwerp (BE)
1988
 Apocalypsis cum Figuris, Deweer Art, Otegem (BE)
 Paintings, Galerie Van Esch, Eindhoven (NL)
1987
 Paintings and collages, Vlaams Cultuurhuis De Brakke Grond, Amsterdam (NL)
 Paintings, Christine Colmant Art Gallery, Brussels (BE)
 Paintings, Galerie S.&H. De Buck, Ghent (BE)

Group exhibitions 
2020
 Art Autun#2020, Rien ne se perd, rien ne se crée, tout se transforme, curated by Reniere & Depla, Musée Rolin and Panopticum, Autun, Bourgogne (FR)
2019
 A Provisional Legacy, The Apocryphal Cabinet of the Adornes, curated by Reniere & Depla, Adornes Domain, Bruges (BE)
2018
 FACES, Psychiatrisch Centrum St. Amandus, Beernem, (BE)
2017
 Between Heaven and Earth II, Huis de Lombart Bruges – PAK, Bruges (BE)
 ART in Motion, collection presentation, Phoebus Foundation HeadquARTers, Antwerp (BE)
2016
 Water.War, Budafabriek, Kortrijk (BE)
2014
 De Boom en de Mens, Museum de Mindere, St. Truiden (BE)
 Health – something of value; Lokettenzaal -Nationale Bank België,  Brussels (BE)
2013
 Now and Then, Central Bank of Europe CBE, Frankfurt (DE)
2012
 Artists of the gallery, Galerie Dukan Hourdequin, Paris (FR)
2010
 Mars op Oostende / Public Private Paintings, Mu.zee, Ostend (BE)
2009
 Galerie Van De Weghe, Antwerp (BE)
 Hof&Huyser, Amsterdam (NL)
2008
 Der eigene Weg. Perspektiven belgischer Kunst / Doing it my way. Perspectives on Belgian art, MKM Museum Küppersmühle für Moderne Kunst, Duisburg (DE)
 Stimulans, BROELMUSEUM, Kortrijk (BE)
 Nature: Attitude, Aspekte Internationaler Fotografie und Malerei, Samuelis Baumgarte Galerie, Bielefeld (DE)
2007
 Passie voor het ongrijpbare, Museum Minderbroeders St.-Truiden (BE)
2005
 Soul, Grootseminarie Bruges (BE)
 Verfraaiing; 12 comments on 12 collection items, Lieven Debrauwer (cineast) comments 'Jarman' (1996, O/C), Stadshallen Bruges (BE)
2004
 Preview, Galerie am Mondsee, Salzburg (AU)
 Eclips, Deweer Art, 25th anniversary show, Transfo Zwevegem (BE)
2003
 Sakrale Kunst, Cultureel Centrum Hasselt (BE)
2001
 De Tuinen van Granada / The Gardens of Granada, Mu.ZEE, Ostend (BE)
 Acquisitions, Mu.ZEE, Ostend (BE)
2000
 Contemporary Art of Belgium, Central Bank of Europe CBE, Frankfurt (DE)
 Multiple Choices, Deweer Art, Otegem (BE)
 Artists of the gallery, Hof&Huyser, Amsterdam (BE)
1999
 Art Concern, Kortrijk (BE)
1996
 Beeld-ding, Museum van Bommel-Van Dam, Venlo (NL)
 Confrontations, Traveling exhibition : Dublin, Johannesburg, Luxemburg, Brussels, Antwerpen, ....
 L’Iconicité de l’Image, Aguas Gallery, Bordeaux (FR)
1991
 Modernism in Painting, Mu.ZEE, Ostend (BE)

Collections 

 C&A Services Brussels (BE)
 S.M.A.K. Ghent (BE)
 Central Bank of Europe, ECB Frankfurt (DE)
 Belfius Art Collection (BE)
 Province of East Flanders (BE)
 Flemish Government (BE)
 Fortis Bank and Insurances (NL / SP)
 Kaderschool Best (NL)
 The Phoebus Foundation (BE)
 Museum Minden (DE)
 APG (NL)
 Mu.ZEE Ostend (BE)
 Museum Kortrijk (BE)
 Nestlé (DE)
 National Bank of Belgium (BE)
 Nordstern Köln (DE)
 University of Antwerp (BE)
 Foundation Liedts- Meesen (BE)
 FOD, Brussels (BE)
 Dela Art Collection (NL)
 Province of West Flanders (BE)

Publications
Several books have been written about Vandekerckhove:
 
 
The experimental film and videomaker Svend Thomsen, founder of Artcinema OFFOFF, turned Picture Palace into a documentary.

Press 
2020
 Johan Debruyne, De betoverende wereld van Hans Vandekerckhove, Kunstmagazine #7, july 2020
 Annelies Van Belle, The Art Couch
 Hans Vandekerckhove en het Advies van Voltaire, Collect, sept.2020
2017
 KoenVan Boxel, Hans Vandekerckhove en de liefde voor zijn vrouw, exhibition review, De Tijd, 30.10.2017
 Lore Adriaenssens, ‘The Christina Paintings’, Hans Vandekerckhove, exhibition review, H’Art, 18.11.2017 (ill.)
2016
 Inge Braeckman, Do Trees have Dreams, review (NL), exhibition review,  H’Art, 17.11.2016 (ill.)
 review in The Art Couch, 03.11.2016
2015
 JozefienVan Beek, Opgaan in het landschap, review, De Morgen, 30.09.2015 p.14
 review in Kunstletters, okt.2015, ill.,  pag. 26
 review in Absoluut, ill, okt.2015
 Grete Simkuté, Hans Vandekerckhove ‘Gimme Shelter’, exhibition review, ill.,  H’Art, 01.10.2015
2012
 Johannes Késenne, Landscape, exhibition review, Galerie Zwart Huis, Knokke, H’Art, 31.05.2012

2011

 Marc Ruyters, Hans Vandekerckhove Tears in Rain (review), ill.,  H’Art, 23.12.2011

2010

 Paul Depondt, A la recherche de l’Arcadie Perdue: Hans Vandekerckhove, ill., p. 21–27,  Septentrion, 03.2010

2009

 Paul Depondt, H’Art, Extra, ill, p. 28–29,  24.12.2009
 Dirk Martens, Twee schilders van de stilte, review, ill, pag. 41, De Standaard, 24–25.12.2009
 Katrien Stragier, Urban Magazine
 Sarah Theerlynck, exhibition review, ill., De Morgen, expo, 17.07.09
 Marc Ruyters, H’Art, exhibition review, ill., Hans Vandekerckhove's Picture Palace25.06.2009
 Hugo Brutin, Hans Vandekerckhove's Picture Palace, Vlaanderen, p. 175-175, juni 2009
 Picture Palace in de Zebrastraat, Gentblogt, 24.06.2009
 AVS TV, 16.06.2009
 Joris Vergeyle, Radio 1, Mezzo, 15.06.2009
 WTV News, 10.06.2009
 Kurt Van Eeghem, Radio Klara, Ramblas, interview,10.06.2009
 Steven Verschoore, Hans Vandekerckhove, Schilderen is duizenden beslissingen nemen/Peindre, c’est prendre mille décisions, ill., pag.22–32,  ISEL nr. 28, jan-feb

2008

 Luk Lambrecht, Doing it My Way, exhibition review Museum MKM Duisburg,  Knack Cultuur, 20.05
 A.M. Poels, De herbetovering van de wereld/ Ons Erfdeel, ill.+ portfolio,  feb., p. 56–63
 Willem Elias, Aspecten van de Belgische kunst na '45/Aperçus de l’art belge après '45, Deel II/Tome II", Snoeck Publishers, 280 p.,170 ill., hardcover, Dutch/French
 Walter Smerling, Jan Hoet, Lorenzo Benedetti, Lieven Vanden Abeele, Doing it My Way, Perspectives on Belgian Art, exhibition catalogue, 104 p., colour illustrations, Dutch/English
 Belfius Art Collection, Acquisitions, exhibition catalogue

2007

 Françoise Brumagne, C’est du Belge/RTBF-TV/La Une, 23.03
 Nicky Aerts, My head is my only home, interview Radio 1-Neon,05.06
 Jeroen Struys, De ontdekking van de horizon/De Standaard, p.F3, ill., 06.06
 Claude Lorent, Paysage/La Libre Belgique, SMAK exhibition review, ill.,13.06
 Jeroen Struys, Hans Vandekerckhove ontdekt zichzelf in het SMAK/Het Nieuwsblad/De Gentenaar, ill., 12.06
 Paul Geerts, Hunkeren naar een paradijselijke toestand, De Tuinen van Eden, p. 126 (ill.), 01.06
 La obra de Juan Munoz y la del belga Vandekerckhove, unidas en una exposición/EFE, Terra Actualidad, 20.09
 Marc Holthof-Marc Ruyters, (Meer dan) Twee soorten van schilderen/H’ART, p. 5, ill., 27.09
 A.G.R., La mirada ciega, Hans Vandekerckhove y Juan Muñoz/El Punto de las Artes, p. 4 ill., 28.09
 Paul Geerts, De 'Blinde Blik' van Muñoz en Vandekerckhove/H’ART, p. 18, ill.  18.10
 Coincidencias menores/Mariano Navarro in El Mundo, El Cultural (ill.), 04.10
 Koen Vertessen, De heldere stilte van Hans Vandekerckhove/, Attitude, p. 202–206 ill, Dec. 2007

2006

 Willem Elias, 25 jaar grafiek uit Vlaanderen, collectie GIMV 1981–2006, Snoeck Publishers, 144 p. color illustrations

2005

 Hugo Brutin, Hans Vandekerckhove, Eenzame tocht naar innerlijkheid/ in Arts Antiques et Auctions, 3 ill.,  p. 96–97, jul./aug
 Jacques Fontier, Verfraaiing, exhibition catalogue, 50 years art collecting by Prov. West-Vlaanderen, 12 keyworks, 24 artist portraits, 120 p., ill., Dutch
 Willy Van den Bussche, Rik Torf, Soul, Inspired Art, exhibition catalogue Episcopal Seminary of Bruges, 15.07–15.09.2005, 236 p., ill. ISBN 90-5856-185-2

2004

 Jan van Hove, Beelden uit de droomwereld, review, ill., De Standaard, p. 15, 04.01
 Eric Rinckhout, De zee is oorlog/De Morgen, p. 28, exhibition review, Mu.ZEE, ill., 15.01
 Jan Braet, Eenzaam is de mens/Knack, p. 50–53, review, ill.,  21.01
 Dirk Martens, Met Hiëronymus in de tuin/De Standaard, Het Nieuwsblad en De Gentenaar, p. 28, review, ill.,  23.01
 Paul Rigolle, Stalking Hiëronymus, Arcadom blog, ill., 11.02
 Françoise Bernardi, Le renouveau du figuratif dans les années '70 au PMMK d’Ostende, ill., 03.02
 Sabine Alexander, Het stalken van Hiëronymus, Hans Vandekerckhove tegen het cynisme van de hedendaagse kunst, Tertio Cultuur, review, ill., 24.03
 Jo Coucke, Eclips, exhibition catalogue, Transfo Zwevegem, 25th anniversary show, Deweer Gallery,  colour illustrations, 170 p.
 Kunstbiënnale 2004, Trends 04, exhibition catalogue, St .-Barbara charity, Gent, 66 p.

2003

 Ontzettend blij met de Witte Man,/LPS in Het Laatste Nieuws, ill), 24.12
 Bert Popelier, De mens in vertwijfeling, Financieel Ekonomische Tijd, p. 13, review, ill.,  30.12
 Ludo Raskin, Sacrale kunst van onze tijd, exhibition catalogue, group show, Cultureel Centrum Hasselt, 110 p., illustrated, Dutch

2002

 Erik Bracke, exhibition review, De Standaard, 13.03
 Bert Popelier exhibition review,  Tijd Cultuur,  20.03
 Prof. Marcel van Jole, Art at the Airport, catalogue  inauguration of the art collection of BIAC, Brussels Airport,  304 p.
 Jo Coucke, Eline Dehullu, Recente Aanwinsten / Recent Acquisitions, exhibition catalogue Stephan Balkenhol, Tony Cragg, Berlinde De Bruyckere, Jan Fabre, Christoph Fink, Johan Tahon, Hans Vandekerckhove and Koen Vanmechelen, Dutch/English, 12 colour illustrations, 24 p. edited by Deweer Art Gallery
 Willy Van den Bussche, Antonio Carvajal, Francisco José Sanchez Montalban, De tuinen van Granada/Los Jardines de Granada", exhibition catalogue, Mu.ZEE Ostend, 12.10.2002–16.02.2003, Stichting Kunstboek, 96 p., ill.

2001

 Sandra Spijkerman, Niet truttig, wel breed (m)/Kunsbeeld, ill., p. 32–33,  01.03
 Kris Naudts, De Ronde is een levensweg, Het Nieuwsblad, ill., 07.03
 Luk Lambrecht, Buitenbeelden van Hans Vandekerckhove /De Morgen, review, ill., 08.03
 Stéphane Rey, Immobilité et Silence/ L’Echo, review, 09.03
 Geert Vander Speeten, Hans Vandekerckhove, exhibition review, De Standaard, 04.04
 Els Fiers, Hans Vandekerckhove, exhibition review, Knack WE, 04.04
 Marc Ruyters, Het kind van de tuin schildert, exhibition review,  Tijd Cultuur, 04.04
 S.B., Oosters aandoende schilderkunst van eigen bodem in Leven in Stijl, revieuw, ill., April
 Merlijn Schoonenboom, Tuinen van het Vlaamse platteland, exhibition review, ill., De Volkskrant, 10.10
 Luk Lambrecht, Tegendraads, exhibition catalogue, Mortier fabriek Avelgem, 84 p.
 Flor Bex, Michel Baudson a.o., Kunst in België na 1975, Mercatorfonds, 438 p., ill.

2000

 Anneleen De Vos, Gentenaars maken van Euro een kunstwerk, Het Nieuwsblad (ill.), 09.04
 Euro's worden kunstwerken, Het Volk, 29.03
 Karel Verhoeven, Bij welke kunstenaar gaan we vandaag op bezoek, De Standaard,18.07
Hof van Eden komt in nieuwe luchthaventerminal, Het Volk (ill.), 28.08
 Katleen van de Sype, Ingelmunsterse molen hangt straks in Zaventem, Het Volk (ill.), 29.08
 Anneleen De Vos, Paradijszoekers in terminal Zaventem, Het Nieuwsblad, 10.08
 Hugo Brutin, Tuin en interieur, exhibition review, Krant van Westvlaanderen, sept.
 Hugo Müller-Vog, Euro-World, European paintings for young cancer patients, edited by Frankfurter Allgemeine Buch, 344 p.

1999

 Paul Geerts, De hof van heden, exhibition review, ill.,  De Morgen,04.04
 Paul Geerts, De hof van heden, exhibition review, ill., De Financieel Ekonomische Tijd,06.03
 Stéphane Rey, Le piment de l’absurde, review,  L’Echo, 12.03
 Madeleine van Oudenhove, Hans Vandekerckhove, review, Le Courrier de Gand, 25.03
 Lieven Defour, Mediteren in hof van Eden, bedrieglijke eenvoud in nieuwe reeks Hans Vandekerckhove, review, De Standaard,30.03
 Paul Geerts, Een schilder in de hof van heden, De tuinen van Eden, p 37-40 (ill.), juli
 Paul Geerts, De hof van heden, review, De Huisarts, 10.03, p. 20
 Christophe Dosogne, Wat kunst kost, Kunst en Cultuur, apr., p. 55

1997

 DJW, Vandekerckhove loopt in de wereld rond als tuinier, review, Het Nieuwsblad April
 Lieven Defour, Vandekerckhove ziet schilder als tuinman, review, De Standaard 17.03

1996

 Luke Clancy, Contemporary Confrontations / The Irish Times,10.02
 DJW, Hans Vandekerckhove verzet zich tegen verandering, Het Nieuwsblad 07.02
 Hugo Brutin, Hans Vandekerckhove: beelden van een moment, ill.,  SSST, p. 22–23 febr.
 Marc Ruyters, Wachters, review, Knack WE, 28.02
 Lieven Defour, Schilderijen om stil bij te worden, review, ill., De Standaard, 23.02
 Joannes Késenne, De wachtende mens, review, ill., Kunst en Cultuur, p. 63, maart
 Lucette Ter Borg, Braaf en veilig aan de voet van de Belgische Vulkaan,  NRC Handelsblad, 06.06
 Joannes Késenne, Melancholie, exhibition catalogue, Centrum voor Kunsten, Begijnhof, Hasselt, 60 p., illustrated, Dutch

1995

 Dominique Dussol, La peinture questionnée / L’Ouest, 31.01
 Frans Duisters, Hans Vandekerckhove, invulbaarheid van het verlangen, review, Kunstbeeld p. 65, maart
 Marc Ruyters, Sakrale Spiege review, Knack WE, p. 124, April
 Pierre Duterte, Un rêve en équilibre, NPM, p. 54, 01.06

1994

 DJW, Deweer Art Gallery schept meer ruimte en licht, Het Nieuwsblad,13.10
 Hugo Brutin, Hulde aan de schilderkunst, Gazet van Antwerpen,17.11
 Erik Bracke, Golven of niet, maar olie drijft boven,  De Morgen,25.10
 Jo Coucke, A Painting Show, exhibition catalogue Deweer Gallery, Anzinger, Baselitz, Brumberg, Carroll, Deconinck, Dessi, Dokoupil, Fetting, Förg, Höckelmann, Kirkeby, Knoebel, Lange, Leroy, Müller, Paladino, Penck, Raveel, Richter, Tchouikov, Toebosch, Tuymans, Uslé, Vandekerckhove, Wallinger, 36 p., illustrated, Dutch/English,

1993

 Lieven Defour, Vandekerckhove schildert monumentale puzzels;  De Standaard,22.05
 PC, Hans Vandekerckhove, exhibition review, Kunst en Cultuur p. 59 juni
 Madeleine van Oudenhove, Hans Vandekerckhove, review,  Le Courier de Gand 28.05
 Mon Devoghelaere, Dodeignes stenen woud, exhibition review, Het Laatste Nieuws 29.05
 Trio bij Veranneman, De Standaard, 21.05
 Marcel van Jole, Fabienne.Dumont and Johan Pas, Joseph-Paul Schneider, Confrontations published on the occasion of a group exhibition with 111 contemporary artists from Belgium and Luxembourg, exhibition catalogue, Lannoo editors, 296 p., illustrated, Dutch/French

1992

 Christiaan Germonpré, De emotionaliteit van de logica, Kreatief-Jrg. 26, nr. 1, p. 79–86
 Willy Van den Bussche, Modernism in Painting, 10 years of painting in Flanders, exhibition catalogue, Mu.ZEE, 05.07–21.09.1992, Stichting Kunstboek, 288 p. ill., Dutch

1991

 Helga Meister, Streifzug durch die Kunst der Nachbarländer (m)/Neues Rheinland (review),29.06
 Irmgard Bernrieder, Ein Komma, das Skrupel verrät (m) / Rheinische Post (review),29.06
 V.H., Monumentale spiegelbeelden van Hans Vandekerckhove (expositie), Het Laatste Nieuws, juni
 D.J.W., Mystiek van Hans Vandekerckhove, exhibition review, ill., Het Nieuwsblad, juni
 Luk Lambrecht, Schilderkunst, exhibition review, Knack WE, 26.05
 Bert Popelier, Het avontuur van Deweer Art Gallery, Kunst en Cultuur, p. 44–45, okt.
 Bart Verschaffel, Het nieuwe schilderen van Vandekerckhove en Swennen, Kunst en Cultuur, p. 59–61, okt.
 Lieven Defour, Recente schilderkunst gaat alle kanten uit, De Standaard, 11.07
 Dirk Snauwaert, Lieven Vandenabeele, Kunst Europa, exhibition catalogue, 06–11.08.1991, initiated by Arbeitsgemeinschaft Deutscher Kunstvereine e.V, 63 Deutsche Kunstvereine zeigen Kunst aus 20 Ländern941 pages

1989

 Jo Coucke, Xth Anniversary Show, exhibition catalogue about the history of the Deweer Art Gallery since 1979 in a survey discussing all 60 shows and reproducing the highlights of the permanent collection of the gallery. 64 p., color illustrations, Dutch.

1988

 DJW, Beeldende kunsten in de streek, Het Nieuwsblad,17.11
 Marc Ruyters, Vandekerckhove, review,  De Morgen, 23.11
 Lieven Defour, Hans Vandekerckhove zoekt inspiratie in Apocalyps, review, ill., De Standaard,29.11
 Johan Pas, Hans Vandekerckhove, review exhibition atVera Van Laer Gallery Knokke,  Forum 1/90 p. 54, nov.
 Kultureel Jaarboek voor de provincie Oost-Vlaanderen, Flemish Government, new acquisitions catalogue
 Willy Van den Bussche, 24 Flemish artists, exhibition catalogue ICC Antwerp, 22.01–21.02.1988, 56 p., ill.

1987

 Bernard Marcelis, Hans Vandekerckhove, exhibition review, ill., Art Press, p. 63, jan.
 Marc Ruyters, Schilders voor (De) Morgen/ De Morgen, p. 1–2, 14.05
 Raymond Baan, Hans Vandekerckhove; mythe en ironie, Kunstbeeld, cover and p. 18–23. Kunstbeeldprijs 1987, okt.
 Paul Depondt, Naamloze naakten in klonterige interieurs, De Volkskrant (ill.),03.10
 V.H., Hans Vandekerckhove bekroond, Het Volk, 07.10
 RLK, Schilder Hans Vandekerckhove met Nederlandse Kunstbeeldprijs, Het Nieuwsblad,14.10
 Luk Lambrecht, Het recente werk van Vandekerckhove wijst op een versobering, ill.review, Knack, p. 19, okt.
 Jo Coucke, Microscopia, Bach, J. Brus, Bunk, Elias, Fabre, Höckelmann, Hofkunst, Immendorff, Lange, Müller, Näher, Panamarenko, Penck, Vandekerckhove, Winters, exhibition catalogue, illustrated, 12 p., Dutch, Deweer Gallery
 Dialogue d’Art, Botanique Brussels, group show, exhibition catalogue
 Jo Coucke & Albert Baronian, Made in Belgium, exhibition catalogue, group show in Musée d’Art Moderne de la ville de Liège, 36 p., illustrated

1986

 Marold Osterkamp, Begegnung mit Nachbarn, Herforder Kreisblatt (GE), 25.07
 Großformatiger Blick über Grenzen – die "Neuen wilden" standen Pate in Westfalen-Blatt, 26.07
 Lieven Defour, Stimulans blikt terug,  De Standaard, 25.07
 Vielseitige Kunst im Eupener "Atelier", Acht junge Künstler stellen aus, Grenz-Echo, 29.11
 Hugo Brutin, De uitverkorene, ill. review, Knack, 09.11
 Lieven Dufour, Hans Vandekerckhove maakt schilderkunst vol spanning, ill.review, De Standaard, 28.10
 De schilderijen van Hans Vandekerckhove gaan voor je ogen leven, review, Elsevier, dec.
 Bart Cassiman, 6 young Flemish Artists, exhibition catalogue, group show in IMF Washington DC, English, color illustrations
 Willy Van den Bussche, 3x schilderen, exhibition catalogue group show, Zeeland (NL).
 Jan, Hoet, Initiatief 86, exhibition catalogue, group show in SMAK, Gent

1985

 Bart De Baere, De sterke kanten van een pathetiek, Hans Vandekerckhove in CD te Gent, review, ill., De Gentenaar, 15.03
 Lieven Van den Abeele, Vandekerckhove toont monumentale figuren, review, ill., De Standaard, 22.03
 Lieven Defour, Kijk op actuele kunst,  De Standaard, 10.11
 Jo Coucke, Ouverture, Bach, Baselitz, J. Brus, Bunk, Cucchi, Dornseif, Fabre, Fetting, Lange, Müller, Paladino, Panamarenko, Vandekerckhove, Virnich, exhibition catalogue, opening the new space.. NL/FR/EN/GE, 52 p., color illustrations

1984

 Lieven Van den Abeele, Hedendaagse Kunst toont prijswinnaars, De Gentenaar,30.01
 Bart De Baere, Ook achter Van den Berghe is er leven, De Standaard, 30.01
 Lieven Van den Abeele, Trendgevoeligen niet te best geselecteerd, De Standaard 29.11
 Norbert De Dauw – Daan Rau, Actuele Picturale Expressies, Artist's statement in exhibition catalogue (Dutch), Noordstarfonds-Gele Zaal Gent, 27.10–02.12.1984, 24 p.,

1983

 DA, Drie schilders in de Lege Ruimte in Brugge, review, De Standaard (ill.), 09.12

External links
 Hans Vandekerckhove
Tatjana Pieters – Hans Vandekerckhove

References 

Belgian artists
Belgian painters
1957 births
Living people